Jeff Thomas (born 18 May 1949 in Newport) is a Welsh former professional footballer. A pacey winger, he progressed through the youth team at Newport County making his first team debut in 1965. He went on to make 209 appearances for Newport scoring 31 goals before retiring in 1973.

In 1971 Thomas was selected for the Football Association of Wales tour of Tahiti, New Zealand, Australia and Malaysia but these matches were not classed as international cap matches. Thomas did however represent Wales at under-23 level.

References

External links

Welsh footballers
Wales under-23 international footballers
Newport County A.F.C. players
English Football League players
Living people
1949 births
Cwmbrân Town A.F.C. players
Association football wingers
Footballers from Newport, Wales